Judith Henley is an Australian opera singer. By July 2011 the soprano had performed more than 30 major roles both in Australia and internationally. According to Carolyn McDowall of The Culture Concept Circle she "has received critical acclaim for her portrayal of Violetta in La traviata, Mimi in La Boheme, and the Countess in The Marriage of Figaro. Judith also has an extensive concert repertoire... [which] ranges from Gilbert and Sullivan and operetta to musical comedy and the romantic heroines of Puccini and Verdi."

Biography 

In October 1975 Judith Henley appeared in Mozart's Così fan tutte by the Arts Council of South Australia at Murray Park College of Advanced Education. In 1981 Henley took the role of Violetta in the Victorian State Opera's production of Verdi's La traviata; the soprano reprised her role in the Australian Opera's production in December 1985, in Canberra.

She sang in the State Opera of South Australia performance of "H.M.S. Pinafore" (as Josephine) in March 1981. Thomas Edmonds and Dennis Olsen appeared in the same production. She has also appeared on stage in the opera "The Gypsy Baron".

References

External links
 Judith Henley and "H.M.S. Pinafore" - Gilbert and Sullivan Discography and review about the State Opera of South Australia's production of the opera
 Judith Henley at AusStage

Australian operatic sopranos
Living people
20th-century Australian women opera singers
Year of birth missing (living people)